Thomas Rider (20 August 1785 – 6 August 1847) was a British Whig politician who held a seat in the House of Commons from 1831 to 1835. He was the eldest son of Ingram Rider of Leeds, Yorkshire and educated at Charterhouse School (1776) and University College, Oxford (1783).

Offices held
He was appointed High Sheriff of Kent for 1829–30. He was elected at the 1831 general election as a Member of Parliament (MP) for Kent, and held the seat until the constituency was divided under the Reform Act 1832. At the 1832 general election he was returned as an MP for the new Western division of Kent, but at the 1835 election he polled poorly, and withdrew from the election at the end of the first day of polling. At the 1837 general election he contested the Eastern division of Kent, but failed to unseat either of the two sitting Conservative Party MPs.

Death
He died on 6 August 1847, aged 81.

Family
He had married Mary Ann Elizabeth Pinnock, but had no children.

References

External links 
 

1785 births
1847 deaths
People educated at Charterhouse School
Alumni of University College, Oxford
Whig (British political party) MPs
Members of the Parliament of the United Kingdom for English constituencies
UK MPs 1831–1832
UK MPs 1832–1835
High Sheriffs of Kent